The Central District of Bostanabad County is in East Azerbaijan province, Iran. At the 2006 census, its population was 69,504 in 15,311 households. The following census in 2011 counted 70,619 people in 18,859 households. At the latest census in 2016, the district had 72,223 inhabitants living in 20,864 households.

References 

Bostanabad County

Districts of East Azerbaijan Province

Populated places in East Azerbaijan Province

Populated places in Bostanabad County